Rusyn is a surname. Notable people with the surname include: 

 Nazariy Rusyn (born 1998), Ukrainian footballer
 Rostyslav Rusyn (born 1995), Ukrainian footballer

See also
 Rusin (surname)
 Russin (surname)